Falls in the Dark is a self-released and independent first demo album by Thirteen Senses. It was released in 2003 and was engineered, mixed and produced by Dare Mason.

It contains three tracks originally from the No Other Life Is Attractive EP and other several songs later to be re-recorded for The Invitation, its singles' B-sides, and some other songs only available in this album.

Track listing
"Thru The Glass" – 6:28
"Gone" – 3:10
"The Salt Wound Routine" – 5:13
"Lead Us" – 5:56
"No Other Life Is Attractive" – 5:47
"Little Unrest" – 5:39
"Slightly Defect Hands" – 4:30
"Exploding Star" – 6:38
"The Questions" – 5:01
"Shape" – 4:21
"Spitting Out Teeth" – 4:13
"This Is An Order" – 2:16
"Do No Wrong" – 5:39

2003 debut albums
Thirteen Senses albums